Laeops is a genus of small lefteye flounders from the Indo-Pacific.

Species
There are currently 13 recognized species in this genus:
 Laeops clarus Fowler, 1934 (Clear fin-base flounder)
 Laeops cypho Fowler, 1934
 Laeops gracilis Fowler, 1934 (Philippine slender flounder)
 Laeops guentheri Alcock, 1890 (Günther's flounder)
 Laeops kitaharae (H. M. Smith & T. E. B. Pope, 1906)
 Laeops macrophthalmus (Alcock, 1889)
 Laeops natalensis Norman, 1931 (Khaki flounder)
 Laeops nigrescens Lloyd, 1907
 Laeops nigromaculatus von Bonde, 1922 (Blackspotted flounder)
 Laeops parviceps Günther, 1880 (Small headed flounder)
 Laeops pectoralis (von Bonde, 1922) (Longarm flounder)
 Laeops sinusarabici  Chabanaud, 1968
 Laeops tungkongensis J. S. T. F. Chen & H. T. C. Weng, 1965

References

Bothidae
Marine fish genera
Taxa named by Albert Günther